Elisabeth Bouchaud (born Tibi) is a French physicist, playwright and actress born 1 March 1961. She is a member of Commissariat à l'énergie atomique (CEA), and works at Ecole Superieure de Chimie et Physique de la Ville de Paris. Since 2015, she is also the Director of the Théâtre de la Reine Blanche in Paris.

She has worked in quantitative fractography, establishing some universal fractal properties of fracture surfaces, a subject pioneered by Benoit Mandelbrot. In fact, the term "fractal" itself was coined by Mandelbrot in 1975, based on the Latin frāctus meaning "broken" or "fractured".

Elisabeth Bouchaud suggested that these fractal properties could be understood in terms of the propagation of the crack front in a disordered environment, which is affected by the vicinity of a depinning transition.

She was awarded the Louis Ancel Prize, the Onsager Medal, and the Aniuta Winter-Klein Prize.

Literary works 

Elisabeth Bouchaud wrote several short stories and plays. Two plays of them were presented at the Avignon Festival: A Contre Voix in 1994 and in 2000, and Apatride, la Tragédie de Médée in 2013. A Contre Voix was translated into English by Mary Luckhurst and put on at the Grace Theatre, London, in 1994. Her other plays are Les liaisons dangereuses (1989), Musical Box (1996), De la matière dont les rèves sont faits (2005) and Puzzle (2015), a stage adaptation of Puzzle of a Downfall Child by Jerry Schatzberg, put on at the theatre La Reine Blanche in 2017.

References

External links
Google Scholar report

1961 births
Living people
Chevaliers of the Légion d'honneur
Knights of the Ordre national du Mérite